Paul Arne Niclas Nylén (born Paul Arne Niclas Larsson on 21 March 1966) is a Swedish former professional footballer who played as a midfielder. He won eight caps for the Sweden national team and was a squad member at the 1990 FIFA World Cup.

Club career
After some early experiences at local BK Olympic and Yugoslav FK Vojvodina he signed in 1987 with Malmö FF, a stronghold of Swedish football. He played almost a decade with Malmö winning three Swedish championships and one cup. In 1994, he had a one-season spell with Scottish second league Ayr United F.C. In 1996, he left Malmö and decide to play abroad spending first six months of the 1996–97 season playing in German 2. Bundesliga club Stuttgarter Kickers before moving to Italy to play the rest of the season with Cosenza Calcio 1914. In 1997, he accepted the challenge to join his former Malmö and national team colleague Jens Fjellström to sign with Dalian Wanda FC. After this one year Chinese adventure, he still played one season back in Sweden with Halmstads BK before retiring in 1999 playing with German lower league VfB Leipzig.

In 1990, he changed his name to Nylén, before that he was known as Niclas Larsson.

International career
Nyhlén played for the Sweden national team between 1989 and 1990, and played a total of eight matches and scored once. He was member of the Swedish team at the 1990 FIFA World Cup.

Career statistics

International 

 Scores and results list Sweden's goal tally first, score column indicates score after each Nyhlén goal.

Honours
Malmö FF
 Allsvenskan: 1987, 1988, 1989
 Svenska Cupen: 1988–89

Dalian Wanda FC
 Jia A: 1997
 Chinese Super Cup: 1997

References

External links
 Profile and stats at KickersArchiv.de 

Living people
1966 births
Footballers from Malmö
Swedish footballers
Swedish expatriate footballers
Sweden international footballers
1990 FIFA World Cup players
Association football midfielders
FK Vojvodina players
Expatriate footballers in Yugoslavia
Allsvenskan players
Malmö FF players
Halmstads BK players
Ayr United F.C. players
Scottish Football League players
Expatriate footballers in Scotland
Stuttgarter Kickers players
1. FC Lokomotive Leipzig players
2. Bundesliga players
Expatriate footballers in Germany
Cosenza Calcio 1914 players
Serie B players
Expatriate footballers in Italy
Dalian Shide F.C. players
Expatriate footballers in China
Swedish expatriate sportspeople in China
Swedish expatriate sportspeople in Yugoslavia
Swedish expatriate sportspeople in Germany
Swedish expatriate sportspeople in Italy
Swedish expatriate sportspeople in the United Kingdom
Swedish expatriate sportspeople in Scotland